Pawn Shop from Heaven is a full-length album by Junky Southern released in 1996.

Track listing

 "All Things Manifest"
 "True Love"
 "Pawn Shop From Heaven"
 "Untitled"
 "Whisper Religion"
 "Hurts So Bad"
 "Paradise Lost"
 "Girl of Our Pictures"
 "Cry Like a Baby"
 "Portable Idiot Man"
 "Mr. Angry Song"
 "Siegessaule "

References

1996 albums
Indie pop albums by American artists